Symphony No. 27 may refer to:

Symphony No. 27 (Brian) by Havergal Brian
Symphony No. 27 (Haydn)
Symphony No. 27 (Michael Haydn)
Symphony No. 27 (Mozart)
Symphony No. 27 (Myaskovsky) by Nikolai Myaskovsky

027